Bruniales is a valid botanic name at the rank of order in the flowering plants. Until recently it was not in use, but a 2008 study suggested that Bruniaceae and Columelliaceae are sister clades. The APG III revision of the APG system, places both families as the only members of the order Bruniales, which is sister to the Apiales, and one of the asterid taxa.

The anthophytes are a grouping of plant taxa bearing flower-like reproductive structures. They were formerly thought to be a clade comprising plants bearing flower-like structures.  The group contained the angiosperms - the extant flowering plants, such as roses and grasses - as well as the Gnetales and the extinct Bennettitales.

23,420 species of vascular plant have been recorded in South Africa, making it the sixth most species-rich country in the world and the most species-rich country on the African continent. Of these, 153 species are considered to be threatened. Nine biomes have been described in South Africa: Fynbos, Succulent Karoo, desert, Nama Karoo, grassland, savanna, Albany thickets, the Indian Ocean coastal belt, and forests.

The 2018 South African National Biodiversity Institute's National Biodiversity Assessment plant checklist lists 35,130 taxa in the phyla Anthocerotophyta (hornworts (6)), Anthophyta (flowering plants (33534)), Bryophyta (mosses (685)), Cycadophyta (cycads (42)), Lycopodiophyta (Lycophytes(45)), Marchantiophyta (liverworts (376)), Pinophyta (conifers (33)), and Pteridophyta (cryptogams (408)).

One family is represented in the literature. Listed taxa include species, subspecies, varieties, and forms as recorded, some of which have subsequently been allocated to other taxa as synonyms, in which cases the accepted taxon is appended to the listing. Multiple entries under alternative names reflect taxonomic revision over time.

Bruniaceae
Family: Bruniaceae,

Audouinia
Genus Audouinia:
 Audouinia capitata (L.) Brongn. endemic
 Audouinia esterhuyseniae (Powrie) A.V.Hall, endemic
 Audouinia hispida (Pillans) Class.-Bockh. & E.G.H.Oliv. endemic
 Audouinia laevis (Pillans) A.V.Hall, endemic
 Audouinia laxa (Thunb.) A.V.Hall, endemic

Berardia
Genus Berardia:
 Berardia angulata E.Mey. ex Sond. accepted as Brunia angulata (E.Mey. ex Sond.) Class.-Bockh. & E.G.H.Oliv. endemic
 Berardia dregeana Sond. accepted as Brunia dregeana (Sond.) Class.-Bockh. & E.G.H.Oliv. endemic
 Berardia laevis E.Mey. ex Sond. accepted as Brunia latebracteata A.V.Hall, endemic
 Berardia sphaerocephala Sond. accepted as Brunia sphaerocephala (Sond.) A.V.Hall, endemic
 Berardia trigyna Schltr. accepted as Brunia trigyna (Schltr.) Class.-Bockh. & E.G.H.Oliv. endemic

Berzelia
Genus Berzelia:
 Berzelia abrotanoides (L.) Brongn. endemic
 Berzelia albiflora (E.Phillips) Class.-Bockh. & E.G.H.Oliv. endemic
 Berzelia alopecuriodes (Thunb.) Sond. endemic
 Berzelia arachnoidea (J.C.Wendl.) Eckl. & Zeyh. endemic
 Berzelia burchellii Dummer, endemic
 Berzelia callunoides Oliv. accepted as Brunia callunoides (Oliv.) Class.-Bockh. & E.G.H.Oliv. endemic
 Berzelia commutata Sond. endemic
 Berzelia cordifolia Schltdl. endemic
 Berzelia dregeana Colozza, endemic
 Berzelia ecklonii Pillans, endemic
 Berzelia galpinii Pillans, endemic
 Berzelia incurva Pillans, endemic
 Berzelia intermedia (D.Dietr.) Schltdl. endemic
 Berzelia lanuginosa (L.) Brongn. endemic
 Berzelia rubra (Willd.) Schltdl. endemic
 Berzelia squarrosa (Thunb.) Sond. endemic
 Berzelia stokoei (E.Phillips) A.V.Hall, endemic

Brunia
Genus Brunia:
 Brunia abrotanoides L. accepted as Berzelia abrotanoides (L.) Brongn. endemic
 Brunia africana (Burm.f.) Class.-Bockh. & E.G.H.Oliv. endemic
 Brunia albiflora E.Phillips, accepted as Berzelia albiflora (E.Phillips) Class.-Bockh. & E.G.H.Oliv. endemic
 Brunia alopecuroides Thunb. accepted as Berzelia alopecuriodes (Thunb.) Sond. endemic
 Brunia angulata (E.Mey. ex Sond.) Class.-Bockh. & E.G.H.Oliv. endemic
 Brunia arachnoidea J.C.Wendl. accepted as Berzelia arachnoidea (J.C.Wendl.) Eckl. & Zeyh. endemic
 Brunia barnardii (Pillans) Class.-Bockh. & E.G.H.Oliv. endemic
 Brunia bullata (Schltr.) Class.-Bockh. & E.G.H.Oliv. endemic
 Brunia callunoides (Oliv.) Class.-Bockh. & E.G.H.Oliv. endemic
 Brunia capitella Thunb. accepted as Staavia capitella (Thunb.) Sond. endemic
 Brunia comosa Thunb. accepted as Berzelia lanuginosa (L.) Brongn. indigenous
 Brunia compacta A.V.Hall, endemic
 Brunia cordata (Burm.f.) Class.-Bockh. & E.G.H.Oliv. endemic
 Brunia dregeana (Sond.) Class.-Bockh. & E.G.H.Oliv. endemic
 Brunia esterhuyseniae (Dummer) Class.-Bockh. & E.G.H.Oliv. endemic
 Brunia fragarioides Willd. endemic
 Brunia glutinosa P.J.Bergius, accepted as Staavia glutinosa (L.) Dahl, endemic
 Brunia laevis Thunb. endemic
 Brunia lanuginosa L. accepted as Berzelia lanuginosa (L.) Brongn. indigenous
 Brunia latebracteata A.V.Hall, endemic
 Brunia laxa Thunb. accepted as Audouinia laxa (Thunb.) A.V.Hall, endemic
 Brunia macrocephala Willd. endemic
 Brunia microphylla Thunb. endemic
 Brunia monogyna (Vahl) Class.-Bockh. & E.G.H.Oliv. endemic
 Brunia monostyla (Pillans) Class.-Bockh. & E.G.H.Oliv. endemic
 Brunia myrtoides (Vahl) Class.-Bockh. & E.G.H.Oliv. endemic
 Brunia neglecta Schltr. endemic
 Brunia nodiflora L. accepted as Brunia noduliflora Goldblatt & J.C.Manning, indigenous
 Brunia noduliflora Goldblatt & J.C.Manning, endemic
 Brunia oblongifolia (Pillans) Class.-Bockh. & E.G.H.Oliv. endemic
 Brunia paleacea P.J.Bergius, endemic
 Brunia palustris (Schltr. ex Dummer) Class.-Bockh. & E.G.H.Oliv. endemic
 Brunia pentandra (Thunb.) Class.-Bockh. & E.G.H.Oliv. endemic
 Brunia phylicoides E.Mey. ex Harv. & Sond. accepted as Brunia dregeana (Sond.) Class.-Bockh. & E.G.H.Oliv. present
 Brunia phylicoides Thunb. endemic
 Brunia pillansii Class.-Bockh. & E.G.H.Oliv. endemic
 Brunia powrieae Class.-Bockh. & E.G.H.Oliv. endemic
 Brunia purpurea (Pillans) Class.-Bockh. & E.G.H.Oliv. endemic
 Brunia rubra Willd. accepted as Berzelia rubra (Willd.) Schltdl. indigenous
 Brunia sacculata (Bolus ex Pillans) Class.-Bockh. & E.G.H.Oliv. endemic
 Brunia schlechteri (Dummer) Class.-Bockh. & E.G.H.Oliv. endemic
 Brunia sphaerocephala (Sond.) A.V.Hall, endemic
 Brunia squalida E.Mey. ex Sond. endemic
 Brunia squarrosa Thunb. accepted as Berzelia squarrosa (Thunb.) Sond. endemic
 Brunia staavioides Sond. accepted as Staavia staavioides (Sond.) A.V.Hall, endemic
 Brunia stokoei E.Phillips, accepted as Berzelia stokoei (E.Phillips) A.V.Hall, endemic
 Brunia teres Oliv. accepted as Thamnea teres (Oliv.) Class.-Bockh. & E.G.H.Oliv. endemic
 Brunia thomae Class.-Bockh. & E.G.H.Oliv. endemic
 Brunia trigyna (Schltr.) Class.-Bockh. & E.G.H.Oliv. endemic
 Brunia tulbaghensis (Schltr. ex Dummer) Class.-Bockh. & E.G.H.Oliv. endemic
 Brunia uniflora L. accepted as Thamnea uniflora Sol. ex Brongn. endemic
 Brunia variabilis (Pillans) Class.-Bockh. & E.G.H.Oliv. endemic
 Brunia verticillata L.f. accepted as Staavia verticillata (L.f.) Pillans, endemic
 Brunia villosa (C.Presl) E.Mey. ex Sond. endemic
 Brunia virgata Brongn. endemic

Linconia
Genus Linconia:
 Linconia alopecuroidea L. endemic
 Linconia cuspidata (Thunb.) Sw. endemic
 Linconia deusta (Thunb.) Pillans, accepted as Linconia cuspidata (Thunb.) Sw. indigenous
 Linconia ericoides E.G.H.Oliv. endemic

Lonchostoma
Genus Lonchostoma:
 Lonchostoma esterhuyseniae Strid, accepted as Brunia esterhuyseniae (Dummer) Class.-Bockh. & E.G.H.Oliv. endemic
 Lonchostoma monogynum (Vahl) Pillans, accepted as Brunia monogyna (Vahl) Class.-Bockh. & E.G.H.Oliv. endemic
 Lonchostoma myrtoides (Vahl) Pillans, accepted as Brunia myrtoides (Vahl) Class.-Bockh. & E.G.H.Oliv. endemic
 Lonchostoma obtusiflorum Wikstr. accepted as Brunia pentandra (Thunb.) Class.-Bockh. & E.G.H.Oliv. endemic
 Lonchostoma pentandrum (Thunb.) Druce, accepted as Brunia pentandra (Thunb.) Class.-Bockh. & E.G.H.Oliv. endemic
 Lonchostoma purpureum Pillans, accepted as Brunia purpurea (Pillans) Class.-Bockh. & E.G.H.Oliv. endemic

Mniothamnea
Genus Mniothamnea:
 Mniothamnea bullata Schltr. accepted as Brunia bullata (Schltr.) Class.-Bockh. & E.G.H.Oliv. endemic
 Mniothamnea callunoides (Oliv.) Nied. accepted as Brunia callunoides (Oliv.) Class.-Bockh. & E.G.H.Oliv. endemic

Nebelia
Genus Nebelia:
 Nebelia fragarioides (Willd.) Kuntze, accepted as Brunia fragarioides Willd. endemic
 Nebelia laevis (E.Mey.) Kuntze, accepted as Brunia latebracteata A.V.Hall, endemic
 Nebelia paleacea (P.J.Bergius) Sweet, accepted as Brunia paleacea P.J.Bergius, endemic
 Nebelia sphaerocephala (Sond.) Kuntze, accepted as Brunia sphaerocephala (Sond.) A.V.Hall, endemic
 Nebelia stokoei Pillans, accepted as Brunia powrieae Class.-Bockh. & E.G.H.Oliv. endemic
 Nebelia tulbaghensis Schltr. ex Dummer, accepted as Brunia tulbaghensis (Schltr. ex Dummer) Class.-Bockh. & E.G.H.Oliv. endemic

Pseudobaeckea
Genus Pseudobaeckea:
 Pseudobaeckea africana (Burm.f.) Pillans, accepted as Brunia africana (Burm.f.) Class.-Bockh. & E.G.H.Oliv. endemic
 Pseudobaeckea cordata (Burm.f.) Nied. accepted as Brunia cordata (Burm.f.) Class.-Bockh. & E.G.H.Oliv. endemic
 Pseudobaeckea cordata (Burm.f.) Nied. var. monostyla Pillans, accepted as Brunia monostyla (Pillans) Class.-Bockh. & E.G.H.Oliv. indigenous
 Pseudobaeckea palustris Schltr. ex Dummer, accepted as Brunia palustris (Schltr. ex Dummer) Class.-Bockh. & E.G.H.Oliv. endemic
 Pseudobaeckea stokoei Pillans, accepted as Brunia pillansii Class.-Bockh. & E.G.H.Oliv. endemic
 Pseudobaeckea teres (Oliv.) Dummer, accepted as Thamnea teres (Oliv.) Class.-Bockh. & E.G.H.Oliv. endemic

Ptyxostoma
Genus Ptyxostoma:
 Ptyxostoma monogyna Vahl, accepted as Brunia monogyna (Vahl) Class.-Bockh. & E.G.H.Oliv. endemic
 Ptyxostoma myrtoides Vahl, accepted as Brunia myrtoides (Vahl) Class.-Bockh. & E.G.H.Oliv. endemic

Raspalia
Genus Raspalia:
 Raspalia angulata (E.Mey. ex Sond.) Nied. accepted as Brunia angulata (E.Mey. ex Sond.) Class.-Bockh. & E.G.H.Oliv. endemic
 Raspalia barnardii Pillans, accepted as Brunia barnardii (Pillans) Class.-Bockh. & E.G.H.Oliv. endemic
 Raspalia dregeana (Sond.) Nied. accepted as Brunia dregeana (Sond.) Class.-Bockh. & E.G.H.Oliv. endemic
 Raspalia globosa (Lam.) Pillans, accepted as Brunia squalida E.Mey. ex Sond. endemic
 Raspalia microphylla (Thunb.) Brongn. accepted as Brunia microphylla Thunb. endemic
 Raspalia oblongifolia Pillans, accepted as Brunia oblongifolia (Pillans) Class.-Bockh. & E.G.H.Oliv. endemic
 Raspalia palustris (Schltr. ex Dummer) Pillans, accepted as Brunia palustris (Schltr. ex Dummer) Class.-Bockh. & E.G.H.Oliv. endemic
 Raspalia palustris (Schltr. ex Kirchn.) Pillans, accepted as Brunia palustris (Schltr. ex Dummer) Class.-Bockh. & E.G.H.Oliv. endemic
 Raspalia passerinoides C.Presl, accepted as Brunia phylicoides Thunb. endemic
 Raspalia phylicoides (Thunb.) Arn. accepted as Brunia phylicoides Thunb. endemic
 Raspalia sacculata (Bolus ex Kirchn.) Pillans, accepted as Brunia sacculata (Bolus ex Pillans) Class.-Bockh. & E.G.H.Oliv. endemic
 Raspalia sacculata (Bolus ex Kirchn.) Pillans, accepted as Brunia sacculata (Bolus ex Pillans) Class.-Bockh. & E.G.H.Oliv. endemic
 Raspalia schlechteri Dummer, accepted as Brunia schlechteri (Dummer) Class.-Bockh. & E.G.H.Oliv. endemic
 Raspalia staavioides (Sond.) Pillans, accepted as Staavia staavioides (Sond.) A.V.Hall, endemic
 Raspalia stokoei Pillans, accepted as Brunia thomae Class.-Bockh. & E.G.H.Oliv. endemic
 Raspalia trigyna (Schltr.) Dummer, accepted as Brunia trigyna (Schltr.) Class.-Bockh. & E.G.H.Oliv. endemic
 Raspalia variabilis Pillans, accepted as Brunia variabilis (Pillans) Class.-Bockh. & E.G.H.Oliv. endemic
 Raspalia villosa C.Presl, accepted as Brunia villosa (C.Presl) E.Mey. ex Sond. endemic
 Raspalia virgata (Brongn.) Pillans, accepted as Brunia virgata Brongn. endemic

Staavia
Genus Staavia:
 Staavia brownii Dummer, endemic
 Staavia capitella (Thunb.) Sond. endemic
 Staavia comosa (Thunb.) Colozza, accepted as Berzelia lanuginosa (L.) Brongn. indigenous
 Staavia dodii Bolus, endemic
 Staavia dregeana C.Presl, accepted as Staavia pinifolia Willd. indigenous
 Staavia glutinosa (L.) Dahl, endemic
 Staavia phylicoides Pillans, endemic
 Staavia pinifolia Willd. endemic
 Staavia radiata (L.) Dahl, endemic
 Staavia staavioides (Sond.) A.V.Hall, endemic
 Staavia trichotoma (Thunb.) Pillans, endemic
 Staavia verticillata (L.f.) Pillans, endemic
 Staavia zeyheri Sond. endemic

Thamnea
Genus Thamnea:
 Thamnea depressa Oliv. endemic
 Thamnea diosmoides Oliv. accepted as Thamnea unstulata (Thunb.) A.V.Hall, endemic
 Thamnea gracilis (Kuntze) Oliv. endemic
 Thamnea hirtella Oliv. endemic
 Thamnea massoniana Dummer, endemic
 Thamnea matroosbergensis A.V.Hall, endemic
 Thamnea teres (Oliv.) Class.-Bockh. & E.G.H.Oliv. endemic
 Thamnea thesioides Dummer, endemic
 Thamnea uniflora Sol. ex Brongn. endemic
 Thamnea unstulata (Thunb.) A.V.Hall, endemic

Tittmannia
Genus Tittmannia:
 Tittmannia esterhuyseniae Powrie, accepted as Audouinia esterhuyseniae (Powrie) A.V.Hall, endemic
 Tittmannia hispida Pillans, accepted as Audouinia hispida (Pillans) Class.-Bockh. & E.G.H.Oliv. endemic
 Tittmannia laevis Pillans, accepted as Audouinia laevis (Pillans) A.V.Hall, endemic
 Tittmannia laxa (Thunb.) C.Presl, accepted as Audouinia laxa (Thunb.) A.V.Hall, endemic
 Tittmannia laxa (Thunb.) C.Presl subsp. oliveri (Dummer) Powrie, accepted as Audouinia laxa (Thunb.) A.V.Hall, endemic
 Tittmannia laxa (Thunb.) C.Presl var. langebergensis Pillans, accepted as Audouinia laxa (Thunb.) A.V.Hall, endemic
 Tittmannia oliveri Dummer, accepted as Audouinia laxa (Thunb.) A.V.Hall, endemic
 Tittmannia pruinosa Dummer, accepted as Audouinia laxa (Thunb.) A.V.Hall, endemic

References

South African plant biodiversity lists
Bruniales